William James Bailey (January 23, 1910 – February 27, 1995) was an Irish-American Communist Party labor activist who fought in the International Brigades of the Republican Army during the Spanish Civil War (1936–1939).

Early life
Bailey was born in Jersey City, New Jersey on January 23, 1910.

Career

Bailey, who was a Communist Party member from the working-class neighborhoods of Hoboken and Hell's Kitchen, went on to fight fascism during the Spanish Civil War. He joined the Abraham Lincoln Brigade, the American contingent of the International Brigades.

During World War II, he served as a business agent for the Marine Firemen, Oilers and Watertenders Union (MFOW), before he himself joined the war effort during the invasion of the Philippines. He attended school to become a U. S. Merchant Marine. He became a third assistant engineer and served on liberty ships during the war, including the SS John Paul Jones, SS Samuel Gompers, and the SS George Powell, as well as the victory ship SS Laredo Victory. His wartime service brought him to Okinawa at the conclusion of the war.

He was expelled from the MFOW during the McCarthy era, and briefly edited The Black Gang News before moving to longshore work.

Bailey later lived in the San Francisco Bay Area.

Personal and death
On February 27, 1995, he died of a long-lasting pulmonary condition caused by asbestos exposure during his work as a seaman.

Works
His autobiography, The Kid from Hoboken, was written with Lynn Damme and published in San Francisco by Circus Lithographic Prepress in 1993. Its full text is available online.

Bill Bailey was featured in the film documentaries Seeing Red (1983) and The Good Fight: The Abraham Lincoln Brigade in the Spanish Civil War (1984).

Bailey's story is told in "The Agitator: William Bailey and the First American Uprising against Nazism" by Peter Duffy (PublicAffairs, March 2019).

See also
Abraham Lincoln Brigade 
International Brigades
Spanish Civil War
Communist Party 
Marine Firemen, Oilers and Watertenders Union (MFOW)
the invasion of the Philippines

References

External links

Bailey's autobiography The Kid From Hoboken
.

1910 births
1995 deaths
Abraham Lincoln Brigade members
Activists from the San Francisco Bay Area
United States Merchant Mariners of World War II
Members of the Communist Party USA
20th-century American memoirists
People from Hoboken, New Jersey
Deaths from lung disease
American anti-fascists
American trade unionists of Irish descent
American communists